Local elections were held in Taiwan on 5 December 2009 to elect magistrates of counties and mayors of cities, councillors in county/city councils, and mayors of townships and county-administered cities, known as the three-in-one elections. The elections were not held in the special municipalities of Kaohsiung and Taipei as well as the counties and cities that were set to be reform as special municipalities in 2010, including Taipei County, Taichung County, Taichung City, Tainan County, Tainan City, or Kaohsiung County. The new formed municipalities has their elections in 2010.

Election summaries

Magistrate and mayor elections 
In the elections held for the 17 posts of county magistrates and city mayors, the Kuomintang (KMT) won control of 12 Counties and Cities, the Democratic Progressive Party (DPP) won control of 4 Counties, while the remaining county, Hualien, was won by an independent candidate. The DPP won 1,982,914 votes, or 45.32 per cent, which was a substantial increase from its 41.95 per cent in the 2005 elections. On the other hand, the KMT received 2,094,518 votes, or 47.87 percent, which was less than the 50.96 percent it won in the 2005 elections of 23 county magistrates and city mayors.

The KMT's traditional strongholds of Northern Taiwan was maintained, although its complete dominance in Northern Taiwan, was terminated when DPP candidate won the Election for the Yilan County Magistrate by a large margin. However, this north-eastern county was once a DPP stronghold for more than two decades until KMT incumbent Lu Kuo-hua, won power four years ago. In Keelung City and Hsinchu City the KMT incumbent Mayors won by a considerable margin, although in Taoyuan County, the KMT candidate won by an unexpectedly narrow margin. The fiercely contested position for Hsinchu County Magistrate, was eventually won by a KMT candidate who received 38% of the vote, whilst the DPP candidate garnered 31%, and an independent candidate received 30%.

In Central Taiwan, all four of the incumbent Magistrates secured their second term. In the traditionally Pan-Blue stronghold of Miaoli County, the KMT incumbent Magistrate won his second term with a large margin of approximately 30% of the votes. While in Changhua County and Nantou County, the KMT incumbent Magistrates both gained just over 50% of the votes, to secure their second terms. In Yunlin County, the DPP incumbent Magistrate gained nearly twice the number of votes as her opposition KMT candidate to secure her second term.

The DPP maintained its traditional strongholds of Southern Taiwan, winning both Chiayi County and Pingtung County by a great margin of 15% and 20% respectively. The KMT incumbent Mayor of Chiayi City won her second term by an unexpectedly narrow margin of 8000 votes. In Eastern Taiwan, the KMT's candidate for Taitung County Magistrate won the DPP's candidate by less 6000 votes, whilst Hualien County Magistrate was won by an Independent Candidate who gained more than twice the number of votes of his opposition KMT candidate. In the outlying islands, the incumbent Magistrate of Penghu County won the DPP's Candidate by less than 600 Votes, whilst in Kinmen County and Lienchiang County, the KMT Candidates gained respectively 38% and 57% of the vote to win both posts.

Councillor elections 
The KMT maintained its unchallenged majority in the county and city councilmen elections, winning 289 seats of the 17 County and City Councils. The DPP won 128 seats, the Taiwan Solidarity Union won 3 seats, the People First Party won 1 seat and the Labor Party won 1 seat. The remaining 170 seats were won by independent candidates. The KMT won 43.94% of the votes, while the DPP won 24.42%.

Township Chiefs 
The KMT maintained its unchallenged majority in the township chiefs elections, winning 121 posts. The DPP won 34 posts, while the remaining 56 posts were won by independent candidates. The KMT won 48.82% of the votes, while the DPP won 20.04%.

Results

Magistrate/mayor elections

Councillor elections

Township/city mayor elections

See also 
 Elections in Taiwan

Notes

References

External links 
 The Elections for Public Offices in Taiwan, Elections Research Center, National Chengchi University.

2009
2009 elections in Taiwan